Quentin Laulu-Togaga'e (born 1 December 1984) is a Samoa international rugby league footballer who plays as a  for the Sheffield Eagles in  RFL Championship.

Laulu-Togaga'e previously played for the Sheffield Eagles, Toronto Wolfpack, a short spell at Halifax in the Championship and the Castleford Tigers in the Super League.

Background
Laulu-Togaga'e was born in Auckland, New Zealand.

Playing career 
While playing for the Souths Logan Magpies in the Queensland Cup, QLT was selected to represent Samoa in two international matches in October 2010, against New Zealand and Tonga, scoring a try against the latter.

In 2012, QLT scored 35 tries for Sheffield, which was an all time season record for the club. Q was also named in the Championship team of the year at full back, and scored a try in Sheffield's 20–16 victory over Featherstone Rovers in the Championship Grand Final. The following year, he scored another 35 tries for Sheffield, and was again named in the team of the season. He also scored a try in Sheffield's 19–12 win over Batley in the Championship Grand Final.

In November 2016, QLT signed with the Toronto Wolfpack for their inaugural season in League 1.

References

External links

Toronto Wolfpack profile
Castleford Tigers profile

1984 births
Living people
Castleford Tigers players
Expatriate rugby league players in England
Expatriate rugby league players in Australia
Halifax R.L.F.C. players
Keighley Cougars players
New Zealand sportspeople of Samoan descent
New Zealand expatriate rugby league players
New Zealand expatriate sportspeople in Australia
New Zealand expatriate sportspeople in England
New Zealand rugby league players
Newcastle Thunder players
Rugby league fullbacks
Rugby league halfbacks
Rugby league players from Auckland
Samoa national rugby league team players
Sheffield Eagles players
Souths Logan Magpies players
Toronto Wolfpack players